Luke Campbell  (born 27 September 1987) is a British former professional boxer who competed from 2013 to 2021. He challenged twice for lightweight world titles; the WBA and The Ring titles in 2017; and the WBA, WBO, The Ring and vacant WBC titles in 2019. At regional level he held the WBC Silver and Commonwealth lightweight titles from 2016 to 2017. As an amateur, Campbell won gold at the 2008 European Championships, silver at the 2011 World Championships, and gold at the 2012 Olympics, all in the bantamweight division.

Amateur career
Senior ABA titles

Campbell competed for St. Paul's Amateur Boxing Club in Hull, winning the English senior ABA bantamweight title in 2007 and retaining in 2008 after beating Gareth Smith 23–1 in the final.

2008 European Championships

He represented England at the 2008 European Amateur Boxing Championships in Liverpool. At the Championships, Campbell defeated Olympic bronze medalist Veaceslav Gojan of Moldova in the quarterfinals and Denis Makarov of Germany in the semifinals before facing the experienced Detelin Dalakliev of Bulgaria in the final.

After four rounds the Bulgarian levelled the scores in the fight to 5 each after he scored a point in the last two seconds of the fight. The decision then went to countback and Campbell was awarded the title making Campbell the first Englishman to win a European amateur title since 1961.

2010 Four Nations Challenge

Following his successful return, following a year long sabbatical to recover from tendon surgery,  to International competition at the WBC Night Of Champions in Cardiff in July, Luke started his 2012 London Olympics preparations by securing gold at the Four Nations Challenge in Sheffield.

On the Saturday Luke, who convincingly won his Featherweight (57 kg) fight by an 11–5 points margin over China's Jun Tan at the WBC Night Of Champions, continued his winning ways by beating Kazakhstan's Shulakov Madi by 6 – 4 in the semi final of the Four Nations Challenge.

In Sunday's final Luke again faced Jun Tan from China, his adversary the previous week at the WBC Night of Champions. As before Luke dominated the proceedings, this time winning by an increased points margin of 11–3.

2011 World Championships

Campbell qualified for the 2012 Olympic Games after winning a silver medal at the 2011 World Amateur Boxing Championships – Bantamweight in Baku, Azerbaijan.

2012 Summer Olympics

At the 2012 London Olympics, Campbell won gold in the 56 kg Bantamweight division after beating Ireland's John Joe Nevin 14:11. Campbell had earlier beaten Italian, Vittorio Parrinello, by 11:9. In the quarter-finals he met Detelin Dalakliev of Bulgaria in his closest bout of the competition, controversially edging it by a score of 16:15. His next opponent, Satoshi Shimizu from Japan- who had earlier been reinstated in the tournament by AIBA after a successful appeal after a defeat by Magomed Abdulhamidov was beaten by 20:11. Campbell beat Nevin in the final bout, and dropped the Irishman at the start of the third round, thus becoming the first bantamweight boxer to win Olympic gold for Great Britain since Henry Thomas in 1908.

A first class postage stamp, depicting Campbell, was issued by Royal Mail and a post box in Hessle Road, Hull was painted gold to commemorate his gold medal win. Local telephone network provider, KC, have also commemorated the win by painting one of their telephone boxes, near to St Paul's Boxing Club, gold.

Campbell was appointed Member of the Order of the British Empire (MBE) in the 2013 New Year Honours for services to boxing.

Campbell ended his amateur career with a record of 153-24.

Professional career

Early career
Campbell's first professional fight took place on 13 July 2013 at Craven Park in his home city of Hull. His opponent was Andy Harris who he beat in the first round. Campbell continued his undefeated start to his career with a fifth-round stoppage of Lee Connelly in Hull on 2 November 2013. In his fifth professional bout Campbell carried on his undefeated record and became the first person to stop Scott Moises.

In April 2014, Campbell announced that he would be taking a break from boxing, pulling out of his next scheduled bout, following his father being diagnosed with cancer.

Despite announcing he would be taking a break from boxing, Campbell fought a further four times in 2014. A points win over Craig Woodruff, a knockout win of Steve Trumble, a technical knockout (TKO) victory over Krzysztof Szot and another TKO win over Daniel Eduardo Brizuela. In March 2015, Campbell faced off against 24 year old Nicaraguan Levis Morales (11–1–1, 4 KOs) at the Ice Arena in Hull. Campbell knocked down Morales in round two and three, before the referee Howard John Foster stopped the fight resulting in a TKO victory for Campbell.

On 1 August, Campbell claimed the vacant WBC International lightweight title by defeating fellow Hullensian Tommy Coyle (21–2, 10 KOs) via ten-round TKO at the KC Lightstream Stadium. This was also a WBC lightweight eliminator. Coyle was knocked down once in round two following a left to the body and three times in round twelve before the referee waved off the fight. Only four months later in December, Campbell lost the title and mandatory status in a split decision loss to French boxer Yvan Mendy (32–4–1, 16 KOs) at The O2 Arena in London on the undercard of Anthony Joshua vs. Dillian Whyte. Campbell was floored for the first time in his professional career in a ragged defensive display as Mendy received a split decision with scores of 115–112, 115–113, while the third judge scored it 115–113 for Campbell.

After a three-month lay off, Campbell started a comeback trail in March on the undercard of Brook-Bizier at the Sheffield Arena in Sheffield, fighting British boxer Gary Sykes (28–4, 6 KOs) for the vacant Commonwealth lightweight title. Campbell made a winning return to the ring in spectacular fashion only needing two rounds to finish Sykes off in his first fight since losing his unbeaten professional record. A left hook that landed hard on the top of Sykes' head had him struggling before a straight right put him down. Although Sykes beat the count, Campbell was all over him. It was the left-hook that opened the door again, this time in the midsection, followed by a right to the temple. Referee Steve Gray moved swiftly in as Sykes' corner was throwing their towel to halt the fight.

Promoter Eddie Hearn revealed Campbell was next due to fight on 30 July 2016 at the First Direct Arena in Leeds for the vacant WBC Silver lightweight title against 30 year old former IBF junior-lightweight champion Argenis Mendez (23–4–1, 12 KOs). Although being floored by a sharp right hand in the second round, Campbell proved to be too quick and dominated the remainder of the fight to claim the vacant WBC Silver lightweight title. From the third round, it became a comfortable fight for Campbell who moved his opponent around the ring and caught him with a succession of punches. The scorecards were all in favour of Campbell 116–111, 117–110, 115–112, who stated he would now like to land a world title shot.

Rise up the ranks

Campbell vs. Mathews, Lopez 
Campbell fought former British and Commonwealth lightweight champion and former world title challenger Derry Mathews (38–10, 20 KOs) on the undercard of the world cruiserweight title fight between Tony Bellew and BJ Flores at the Echo Arena on 15 October, live on Sky Sports. This was the first defence of the WBC Silver lightweight title in a scheduled twelve round bout. The fight started off as a brawl, however Campbell proved to be too quick as he retained his titles and kept his future world title shot alive after stopping Mathews in round four. Mathews was dropped following a couple of left hooks to his body. In the post fight interview, Campbell claimed, despite winning via stoppage, his game plan was 'to outbox Mathews for a points win'.

On 3 January 2017, it was announced that Campbell would defend his WBC Silver title against Jairo Lopez (21–6, 14 KOs) at the Ice Arena in Hull on 25 February. The title defence would be part of a triple header, also including fellow Hullensian Tommy Coyle and Gavin McDonnell challenging for the vacant WBC super-bantamweight title. Campbell won the fight in round two after a well timed uppercut floored Lopez. Referee Ian-John Lewis halted the fight. Lopez was also dropped in round one just before the bell rang. Campbell retained his WBC Silver lightweight title. After the fight, Campbell and promoter Eddie Hearn both said the fight they were chasing next is a rematch with French boxer Yvan Mendy, to avenge his sole loss. "Mendy has done the worst thing possible in beating me", Campbell said after the fight.

Campbell vs. Pérez
On 10 April 2017, Eurosport and Sky Sports announced that Campbell would be involved in a WBA lightweight title eliminator against former WBA interim lightweight titlist Darleys Pérez (33–2–2, 21 KOs) on the Anthony Joshua vs. Wladimir Klitschko undercard at the Wembley Stadium on 29 April 2017. The winner would be in the number one position to challenge champion Jorge Linares. Pérez weighed over the limit at 136.3 pounds, so had he won the bout, he would not have been eligible for the mandatory spot. Campbell racked up the win via a ninth-round stoppage win, which was due to injury. It was said that Pérez hurt his left arm after a throwing a left hook. He signaled to the referee that he could not continue and the fight was stopped at 1 minute 28 seconds into the round. Although Pérez started the fight well, enough to win the first three rounds, he physically looked gassed by the later rounds where Campbell took over. With the win, Campbell was made the new mandatory challenger to WBA champion Jorge Linares. Eddie Hearn said he would speak to Golden Boy Promotions to push things forward for the fight to be made.

World title challenge

Campbell vs. Linares
Golden Boy Promotions matchmaker, Robert Diaz, announced that WBA and The Ring lightweight champion Jorge Linares (42–3, 27 KOs) would next fight on 23 September 2017 and ruled out Campbell as his opponent. The plan being to have Campbell to fight on the undercard. If both fighters win their respected bouts, they would meet in the future. On 21 July 2017 the WBA ordered Linares to make a mandatory defence against Campbell. As per WBA rules, a titleholder must fight a mandatory within nine months, this time would expire on 23 July, having won the title from Crolla in September 2016. Both sides were given 30 days to come to an agreement for the fight. On 27 July, a deal was reached for Linares and Campbell to fight at The Forum in Inglewood, California on 23 September 2017. The bout will be shown live on Sky Sports in the UK and on HBO: Boxing After Dark in the US. In an interview, Linares said, "I am excited to make my return to the US and to headline a HBO show for the first time. I know Campbell is a tough [...] I am confident that I will emerge victorious on September 23rd." This fight would mark the second time Campbell fights professionally in California. In front of 4,125, Linares won his twelfth straight fight, retaining his WBA world title after twelve rounds against Campbell. One judge scored the fight 115–113 for Campbell, the remaining two had it 115–112 and 114–113 in favour of Linares, giving him the split decision win. ESPN.com also scored the fight 115–112 for Linares. Linares dropped Campbell with a straight right hand to the head in round two. Between rounds five and nine, Campbell took control of the fight. Linares began winning the championship rounds. Had Campbell not been knocked down early in the fight, the verdict would have been a split draw.

Campbell believed he won the fight, speaking to Max Kellerman he said, "No one can ever doubt my heart. Yeah, I got off to a rocky start. He hit me with a nice, clean shot in the second round, caught me on the eye, cut it. I wasn’t dazed.  From there, I had double vision in one eye for the rest of the fight. But from then, I out-classed him. I thought I won the fight. He’s a great champion, but I thought I out-classed him. I didn't think he was landing any shots whatsoever, and I was catching him with all the clean shots." Linares praised Campbell for his efforts, "He was a tough opponent. Many people said he was very easy, but it’s not for no reason he’s an Olympic champion. I fought very well all the way to the twelfth round. And I think in the fifth round, I started to box him a little bit because I didn't wanna get hurt." CompuBox stats showed Linares landed 140 of 414 thrown (34%), while Campbell was credited to landing 141 of his 524 thrown (27%). After the fight, promoter Eddie Hearn stated that Campbell could fight the winner of Crolla vs. Burns or another possible opponent would be WBO lightweight champion Terry Flanagan. A day after the fight, Campell revealed that his father had died of cancer two weeks before the fight. Campbell was in the US at his training camp when his father died at home, with family members. The fight drew an average of 687,000 viewers and peaked at 726,000 viewers on HBO.

Regaining composure 
On 3 May 2018, it was announced by Matchroom that Campbell would appear on the Bellew-Haye II card the next day at the O2 Arena in London in a six-round fight. Campbell fought and defeated Troy James (20-5-1, 5 KOs). In round two, Campbell hit James with a left uppercut followed by a right hand that dropped him. James quickly recovered and survived the remainder of the round. In round four, Campbell dropped James with a hard shot, again James showed heart in getting up off the canvas. In the following round, Campbell started to unload and landed a barrage of unanswered punches before the referee stepped in to stop the fight.

On 31 July, Campbell announced Shane McGuigan as his new trainer. Speaking on the partnership, Campbell said, "I'm incredibly excited to be teaming up with Shane. I've always heard good things about him within boxing but having trained under him for a few weeks now I can vouch for just how good he is. We've already struck up a great relationship and I have no doubt he is going to help take me to the next level. I want to become a world champion and Shane has a proven track record of achieving that with his fighters. It's a thriving gym with a great atmosphere and world class fighters, and that's where I want to be." In his statement, McGuigan said he would help Campbell become an elite as well as win a world title.

Campbell vs. Mendy II 
On 6 August, Sky Sports announced the rematch between Campbell and 33 year old French boxer Yvan Mendy (40-4-1, 19 KOs) was confirmed to take place on the Anthony Joshua vs. Alexander Povetkin undercard at the Wembley Stadium in London on 22 September. Since defeating Campbell in their first fight in December 2015, Mendy had gone on to win seven fights in a row and picked up a #1 ranking with WBC at lightweight. Hearn called the bout a 'true 50–50 fight' as both boxers had improved since their first meeting. Campbell won the bout on points to avenge the earlier defeat. After twelve rounds the scorecards read 119–109, 118–111 and 116–112 in favour or Campbell. Mendy had his moments in the earlier rounds, but once Campbell adjusted, he was able to box and move to pound out a decision victory in what was a WBC lightweight title eliminator.

Campbell vs. Yung 
On 15 March 2019, Campbell, who was now the mandatory challenger to Mikey Garcia's WBC lightweight title, travelled to Philadelphia, Pennsylvania to take on Adrian Yung. Both men had never been stopped prior to the bout, but that changed when Campbell landed a left hook in the fifth round followed by a flurry of punches which forced the referee to halt the fight, making Campbell the winner by fifth-round technical knockout.

Second world title challenge

Campbell vs. Lomachenko 

On 31 August 2019, Campbell challenged the top pound-for-pound fighter and three-division world champion, Vasiliy Lomachenko, for the WBA (Super), WBO, The Ring, and vacant WBC lightweight titles at The O2 Arena in London.

Prior to the fight on 22 August 2019, Sky Sports released "The Gloves are Off: The Debate (Lomachenko vs. Campbell)" segment, hosted by former cruiserweight world champion Johnny Nelson, with retired, former world champions Tony Bellew, Carl Froch, David Haye and Paulie Malignaggi giving their pre-fight analysis as part of the lead up to the fight. Although all parties agreed Campbell will be the underdog going into the fight, with the odds being stacked in Lomachenko's favour, all praised Campbell's skill and amateur pedigree, with Malignaggi insisting Campbell is "one of the better fighters in the world to have not won a world championship."

On the night of the fight, Lomachenko put on a dominant display, dropping Campbell in the eleventh round and winning a wide unanimous decision with scores of 119-108, 119-108, 118-109.

Final fight and retirement

Campbell vs. García 
On 2 January 2021, Campbell faced undefeated Ryan García for the vacant WBC interim lightweight title in what would ultimately be his final professional fight. Despite entering as the pre-fight betting underdog, Campbell dropped his opponent in the second round with a left hand, from which García recovered. García returned the favour in the seventh round, by dropping Campbell with a left hook to the body. Campbell, however, was not able to beat the count and suffered the first and only stoppage loss of his career.

On 30 July 2021, Campbell announced his retirement from boxing. He released a statement on Twitter, saying, "Every fight, right the way from my debut on 13th June 2013, up to my last on 2nd January 2021, the cheers and messages of encouragement have always been monumental. Throughout my career I've tried to test myself against the very best in the industry and never shied away from anyone. I'm so grateful this hasn't gone unnoticed from supporters and I appreciate you all."

Personal life
Campbell was born in Hull and supports local football team Hull City. He has three sons with his wife Lynsey Kraanen who is a model. Campbell has a notable boxing heritage, with his grandfather having been an Irish boxing champion. Many of Campbell's relatives still live in Ireland.

Two weeks before Campbell fought for the WBA and ring lightweight titles against Jorge Linares his father passed away. Campbell did not tell anyone as he did not want the Linares camp thinking it was a weakness. Speaking on this he said "I probably cried once a day. I had to try and shut my feelings off. After the fight I had a good cry. The only thing that kept me going is I know what my dad would have wanted for me."

In the media
In December 2012 it was announced that Campbell would take part in ITV's Dancing on Ice series 8 which started on 6 January 2013, skating with professional Jenna Smith. He reached the final of Dancing On Ice 2013 with Beth Tweddle and Matt Lapinskas.

Professional boxing record

See also
2012 Summer Olympics and Paralympics gold post boxes

References

External links

Luke Campbell - Profile, News Archive & Current Rankings at Box.Live

1987 births
Living people
English male boxers
Bantamweight boxers
Boxers at the 2012 Summer Olympics
Olympic boxers of Great Britain
Olympic gold medallists for Great Britain
English Olympic medallists
English people of Irish descent
Sportspeople from Kingston upon Hull
Olympic medalists in boxing
Members of the Order of the British Empire
Medalists at the 2012 Summer Olympics
AIBA World Boxing Championships medalists
Commonwealth Boxing Council champions
Lightweight boxers
Southpaw boxers